The twelfth and final season of the long-running Australian medical drama All Saints: Medical Response Unit began airing on 3 February 2009 with the final episode airing 27 October 2009. The season concluded after 37 episodes.

Plot 
In its 12th and final year, the newly formed Medical Response Unit (MRU) takes centre stage treating patients at the site of accidents and then bringing them to the Emergency Department for continued medical care. The MRU, led by Mike Vlasek, is on the front line of a vast range of medical disasters, including an explosion at a winery and a devastating bus crash. The year starts with the ED team dealing with the shocking aftermath of the news of Erica's death. Bart and Amy continue to be at logger-heads until Bart's wise counsel to a troubled patient results in them starting a secret love affair. Steve joins the MRU and is confronted with demons from his past. Gabrielle must deal with her father's heart attack and new paramedic Jo learns whether she has Huntington's disease. Frank continues to fiercely protect his team, and starts the new intern program. The series ends with the ED and MRU teams sharing an emotional farewell dinner in honour of long time All Saints nurse, Von Ryan.

Cast

Main 
 John Howard as Frank Campion
 Tammy Macintosh as Charlotte Beaumont
 Judith McGrath as Von Ryan
 Andrew Supanz as Bartholomew West
 Virginia Gay as Gabrielle Jaegar
 Jack Campbell as Steve Taylor
 Kip Gamblin as Adam Rossi
 Ella Scott Lynch as Claire Anderson
 Alix Bidstrup as Amy Fielding
 Mirrah Foulkes as Jo Mathieson
 John Waters as Miklos Vlasek

Recurring 
 Celeste Barber as Bree Matthews (31 episodes)
 Anna Volska as Katerina Ajanovic (9 episodes)
 Jonathan Wood as Elliott Parker (9 episodes)
 Tom Oakley as Ian Kingsley (8 episodes)
 Sarah Woods as Debra Rossi (7 episodes)

Guest 
 Curtis Oakes as Ben Jaeger (3 episodes)
 Genevieve Hegney as Juliet Martin (2 episodes)
 John Sheerin as Russell Jaeger (2 episodes)
 Mike Smith as Heath Velaga (1 episode)
 Renee Lim as Suzi Lau (1 episode)

Revamp 
In 2009, another attempt to stem the softening ratings and add a bit of excitement to the series, Seven Network executives decided to rejuvenate again, introducing a medical response unit to deal with tricky rescues which involved a helicopter going to remote locations to rescue patients who needed assistance. They would then bring those patients back to the ED and the staff there would assist in their treatment. Along with the addition of the new "department" the show was also renamed to All Saints: Medical Response Unit, the introduction of Mirrah Foulkes and the new MRU proved to lift the ratings substantially, but then levelled out at where they were prior to the revamp.

Cancellation 
In June 2009, after months of rumours that the cancellation of All Saints was imminent, a spokeswoman from the Seven Network informed The Daily Telegraph that the episode order had been trimmed. Season twelve of All Saints would screen 24 episodes instead of the usual 40 episodes and that production would cease in August instead of November.

In July 2009, exactly one month later after the first announcement, Tim Worner, Seven's Director of Programming at the time announced that All Saints had been cancelled. He told Michael Idato of the Sydney Morning Herald, "All Saints is a show which Seven and viewers have loved. However, an audience shift and increased production costs are behind this tough decision." He also informed Idato that the episode order trim had been reverted and the season would complete a 37 episode order, finishing on episode 493. It was reported after the announcement that since the introduction of the MRU in 2009 it inflated the cost of each episode to $500,000. Many people still argue as to why the MRU was introduced in the first place or should have been removed instead of axing the show if the network was wanting to cut costs.

In the Feb/Mar 2010 GQ magazine in 2010, Tim Worner said his one regret was "Axing All Saints. But it was the right call at the time and we have two new drama projects in development."

Episodes

References 

All Saints (TV series) seasons
2009 Australian television seasons